The Center for International Media Assistance (CIMA) is an initiative of the National Endowment for Democracy (NED). CIMA works to improve the development of independent media worldwide while working to strengthen the support for such development. The center works to improve the effectiveness of existing media development efforts by conducting research and bringing together a broad range of experts to share their experiences. CIMA's mission is based on the conviction that free and independent media play an indispensable role in developing sustainable democracies around the world.

History

The authorization to start CIMA was first introduced in the Intelligence Reform and Terrorism Prevention Act of 2004 in order to create an establishment of a media network that would ensure the promotion of freedom of the press and freedom of the media worldwide, respect journalistic identity, and ensure that widely accepted standards for professional and ethical journalistic and editorial practices are employed when assessing international media. This media network, later established as CIMA, was aimed to provide an effective forum to convene a broad range of individuals, organizations, and governmental participants involved in journalistic activities and the development of free and independent media.

The Secretary of State authorizes grants for the such funding of a media network through the National Endowment for Democracy to manage a free and independent media network.

This media network was proposed as the Center for International Media Assistance in a proposal by the National Endowment for Democracy to the Bureau of Democracy, Human Rights, and Labor—the United States Department of State's largest single funder of independent media. Since the founding of the National Endowment for Democracy, media has played an important role in promoting democracy for the National Endowment for Democracy, with around $14 million annually going to support media development.

In 2006, CIMA was founded as an initiative of the National Endowment for Democracy with encouragement from Congress and a grant from the State Department's Bureau of Democracy, Human Rights and Labor.

Activities

By focusing on effectiveness, sustainability, innovation, and funding, these four cross-cutting issues in media development encompass CIMA's efforts to improve the quality and capacity of the media sector.

CIMA approaches its mission through three main activities: reports, events, and catalyst activities. In order to remain a neutral platform and avoid competition with existing media development organizations, CIMA does not give grants or any other form of funding.

The center strives to build a foundation of knowledge for media development donors, implementors, and civil society actors on the best practices and solutions for improving media systems.

Reports
CIMA's reports provide a knowledge base on a variety of topics in media assistance. The goal of these reports is to provide policymakers, as well as donors and practitioners, with practical information on the importance of free media to the development of a society. These reports fall into three basic categories: research reports, working group reports, and event reports.

Empowering Independent Media
CIMA's inaugural 2008 report Empowering Independent Media: U.S. Efforts to Foster Free and Independent Media Around the World was a first-of-its-kind look at the media development field as a whole. This comprehensive report provides an in-depth assessment of U.S. international media development efforts, both public and private, and calls on future efforts to be more long-term, comprehensive, and need-driven. Recommending a more holistic approach, the report looks at the international media development field from a number of perspectives: funding, professional development, education, the legal-enabling environment, economic sustainability, media literacy, new media, and monitoring and evaluation.

According to the report, media assistance is increasingly being regarded as a fundamental building block in developing democratic states. These efforts can help countries make democratic transitions, spur economic growth, improve government accountability, conduct public health campaigns, increase education and literacy levels, and empower women and minorities.

The report's recommendations include: establishing media development as its own sector of international assistance rather than only as a part of other development efforts as is the current trend; taking longer-term approaches to projects; engaging the local media community more in project design and implementation; improving journalists’ professional skills and ethical standards; providing greater support to improve the legal-enabling environment; emphasizing media literacy; building stronger media management skills; integrating new technology; refining monitoring and evaluation methods; improving coordination among donors and implementers; and integrating communication for development strategies in overall media assistance efforts.

On May 2, 2007, CIMA hosted its inaugural event to launch the report. The event was held at the U.S. Capitol building to celebrate World Press Freedom Day with honorary co-hosts of the Congressional Caucus for Freedom of the Press.

Events
Raising the visibility of international media development and improving its effectiveness are core goals of the center. CIMA works to improve understanding of how free and independent media matter by hosting discussions and panels in addition to convening working groups and publishing reports.

These events are generally open to the public and range from panel discussions on topics such as new media or the status of media in a specific country to roundtable discussions featuring implementers, donors, academics, and government representatives to offer commentary on critical issues in the field. CIMA also organizes working groups, which are not open to the public, but instead invite a range of experts on an issue to have a substantive discussion and share their knowledge. The center also regularly holds events to launch its reports as well as relevant reports published by other organizations. These events are usually held in the Washington, DC area, but occasionally can be hosted abroad.

Key issue areas for the events focus on effectiveness, sustainability, innovation and funding in different geographical regions. Previous discussion topics range from foreign aid, philanthropy and change in media systems  to Internet governance and the future of news. Recaps of these events can be found on CIMA's blog along with other commentaries on media development issues.

Catalyst Activities
When CIMA recognizes a need in the media assistance field, it works to fill that gap. Toward this end, CIMA developed an online bibliographic database of media assistance resources. With over 900 books, articles, reports, and manuals, this database serves as an important resource for anyone interested in media development issues. In order for these resources to be comprehensive, CIMA compiles data on media systems in Africa, Asia, Europe and Eurasia, Latin America and the Caribbean, and Middle East and North Africa.

CIMA's legal environment working group also noted the need for a centralized resource for media lawyers around the world. Following up on this idea, CIMA worked with the Annenberg School for Communication at the University of Pennsylvania to launch a Web site called Global Media Law. This site serves as a networking and information resource for anyone interested in media law issues around the world.

References

External links
 Center for International Media Assistance

National Endowment for Democracy
Organizations based in Washington, D.C.